Joaquín Aros Melgarejo (born 23 January 1996) is a Chilean footballer who plays for Deportes Santa Cruz.

References

1996 births
Living people
Chilean footballers
Chilean Primera División players
Deportes Temuco footballers
Association football midfielders
People from Talcahuano